Ashleigh Nelson is the name of:

 Ashleigh Nelson (field hockey) (born 1987), Australian hockey player
 Ashleigh Nelson (sprinter) (born 1991), English sprinter